Bari Aapa (Lit: Older Sister)is an Urdu language Pakistani telenovela first broadcast in Pakistan by Hum TV. Written by Samira Fazal and directed by Saife Hasan, the telenovela, which premiered on 1 September 2012, has been produced by Momina Duraid and ended its run in Pakistan on 16 February 2013 after telecasting 22 episodes. Featuring actors Savera Nadeem, Noman Ejaz, Ayesha Khan, Arjumand Rahim, Sajida Syed, Waqas Khan, Fahad Mirza, Mustafa Changazi, Sarah Khan,  Syed Jibran and Madiha Rizvi.

Plot
Zubeida (Savera Nadeem), more commonly known as Badi Aapa, is the central character of the telenovela who possesses a rigid and dictatorial nature and her husband, Farmaan (Noman Ijaz), likes to stay out of her way. Zubeida's only daughter, Sharmeen (Sarah Khan), is in love with a man named Essa (Fahad Mirza) and wants to marry him but Zubeida doesn't agree to the union. Sharmeen decides that the only way to convince her mother is to talk to her uncle, Ghazanfar (Waqas Khan), who is the only man Zubeida listens to because Zubeida and Ghazanfar used to like each other when they were young. But at the same time Sharmeen gets to know that her mother has already decided of getting her married to Ghazanfar's son, Adeel (Mustafa Changazi), who happens to be Zubeida's nephew. Adeel had always loved Sharmeen. But as Adeel's mother, Firdouz (Arjumand Rahim), i.e. Zubeida's younger sister, doesn't want him to marry Sharmeen, Adeel refuses and Zubeida gets angry on her younger sister. And it is soon later that Zubeida gets to know that her husband has secretly got married for the second time to a lady named, Neelam (Ayesha Khan Jr).

Zubeida believes that Ghanzanfar is still in love with her and will leave his family for her so she demands a divorce. Farmaan begs her to stay but Zubeida insists and tells him about Ghanzanfar still loving her.

In a taxis on the way to Ghanzanfar Zubeida recounts the loving moments shared between the two. on arrival at her sisters home she's surprised her sister is back and that not only does Ghanzanfar care for his wife but he only sees Zubeida as his wife's sister and nothing more. Zubeida, embarrassed, makes her excuses and leaves to go back home.

On arrival at home her husband tells her he has divorced her and he is moving out with Neelam.

Cast 
 Savera Nadeem as Zubeida a.k.a. Bari Aapa
 Noman Ijaz as Farman (Zubeida's husband)
 Ayesha Khan Jr. as Neelam (Farhan's second wife)
 Sajida Syed as Amma (Zubeida's mother)
 Arjumand Rahim as Firdouz a.k.a. Choti Aapa (Zubeida's younger sister)
 Waqas Khan as Ghazanfar (Firdouz's husband)
 Syed Jibran as Shakeel (Zubeida's younger brother)
 Madiha Rizvi as Riffat (Shakeel's wife)
 Mustafa Changazi as Adeel (Firdouz's son)
 Sarah Khan as Sharmeen (Zubeida's daughter)
 Fahad Mirza as Essa (Love interest of Sharmeen)

Broadcast and release 
Badi Aapa originally premiered on Hum TV from 1 September 2012 to 17 February 2013. 
A dubbed version of the serial was aired on Hum Pashto 1 with the title مشرہ خور.

The drama serial has also been broadcast in India by Zindagi, premiering on 7 November 2014. Due to its popularity in India it was re-run again on Zindagi from 13 April to 7 May.

It was also released on the iflix and was available to stream from 2017 to 2019. It is also available on Eros Now and since mid-2020, the show is available for streaming on ZEE5.

References

External links 
 
Official Website at ZEE5

Urdu-language telenovelas
Pakistani telenovelas
Samira Fazal
Television series written by Samira Fazal
2012 telenovelas
2012 Pakistani television series debuts
2013 Pakistani television series endings
Hum TV original programming
Hum Sitaray
Zee Zindagi original programming